Kanatak may also refer to:
Kanatak, Alaska or Native Village of Kanatak (or Native Tribe of Kanatak), an Alutiiq federally recognized village on Alaska Peninsula, Kodiak Island Borough
Kanatak Lagoon, a lagoon at Portage Bay, Alaska
Kanatak Lake (or Kanata Lakes), a neighbourhood officially referred to as Marchwood-Lakeside within the northern section of Kanata, Ontario, Canada